The 2021 Bulgarian Cup Final was the final match of the 2020–21 Bulgarian Cup and the 81st final of the Bulgarian Cup. The final took place on 19 May 2021 at Vasil Levski National Stadium in Sofia.

The clubs contesting the final were Arda Kardzhali and CSKA Sofia. For the symbolic hosts, this was their historic first cup final, while for CSKA, it was the 2nd consecutive and 34th overall. This was the 3rd time both teams faced each other in the tournament's history.

CSKA Sofia won the final by the score of 1–0 and lifted their 21st cup title, ending a 5-year drought after their last triumph in 2016. It also sealed their place in the second qualifying round of 2021–22 UEFA Europa Conference League.

Route to the Final

Match

Details

References 

Bulgarian Cup finals
2020–21 in Bulgarian football
FC Arda Kardzhali matches
PFC CSKA Sofia matches
Bulgarian Cup Final